The Originals, often called "Motown's best-kept secret", were a successful Motown R&B and soul group during the late 1960s and the 1970s, most notable for the hits "Baby I'm for Real", "The Bells", and the disco classic "Down to Love Town." Formed in 1966, the group originally consisted of baritone singer Freddie Gorman, tenor/falsetto Walter Gaines, and tenors C. P. Spencer and Hank Dixon (and briefly Joe Stubbs). Ty Hunter replaced Spencer when he left to go solo in the early 1970s. They had all previously sung in other Detroit groups, Spencer having been an original member of the (Detroit) Spinners and Hunter having sung with the Supremes member Scherrie Payne in the group Glass House. Spencer, Gaines, Hunter, and Dixon (at one time or another) were also members of the Voice Masters. As a member of the Holland–Dozier–Gorman writing-production team (before Holland–Dozier–Holland), Gorman (as a mailman) was one of the co-writers of Motown's first number 1 pop hit "Please Mr. Postman", recorded by the Marvelettes. In 1964 the Beatles released their version and in 1975 the Carpenters took it to number 1 again. This was the second time in pop history that a song had reached number 1 twice as "The Twist" by Chubby Checker, reached number 1 in both 1960 and 1961. In 2006, "Please Mr. Postman" was inducted into the Songwriters Hall of Fame.

History
The group found success in the latter half of the 1960s as background singers for recordings by artists such as Jimmy Ruffin's "What Becomes of the Brokenhearted", Stevie Wonder's "For Once in My Life" and "Yester-Me, Yester-You, Yesterday", David Ruffin's "My Whole World Ended (The Moment You Left Me)", Marvin Gaye's "Chained" and "Just to Keep You Satisfied", Edwin Starr's "War" and "25 Miles", and many more. Much like the Andantes, Motown's in-house female backing group, the Originals are on countless Motown recordings but were never credited.

The Originals recorded plenty of their own material for Motown but saw only one single release before 1969. A cover of Lead Belly's "Goodnight Irene" was released in 1966, backed with "Need Your Lovin'" (both featuring Joe Stubbs on lead) but failed to chart. They recorded the song "Suspicion" in 1966, but it was never released as a single. Nevertheless, it has become a Northern soul classic. The track has since been featured on many of their compilation albums and many Northern Soul compilations. The group saw the release of two more singles, "We've Got a Way Out of Love" and "Green Grow the Lilacs", which failed to chart, in 1969.

The Originals found their biggest commercial success under the guidance of Marvin Gaye, who co-wrote and produced two of the group's biggest singles, the doo-wop influenced ballads "Baby, I'm for Real" and "The Bells". The former was such a hit that the group's debut album, 1969's Green Grow the Lilacs, was soon reissued as Baby, I'm for Real. The latter disc, from 1970s Portrait of the Originals, sold more than one million copies and received a gold disc awarded by the R.I.A.A. Both songs became seminal soul music recordings, and both have since been covered: 1990s R&B group After 7 re-recorded "Baby, I'm for Real" and made it a hit again in 1992, while another 1990s R&B group, Color Me Badd, re-recorded "The Bells" for one of their albums.

The release of Originals singles remained constant throughout the early 1970s, although chartings proved lower and more sporadic. The year 1970 saw two album releases and four singles, all of which were top 20 R&B Hits. Ballads like "We Can Make It, Baby" and "God Bless Whoever Sent You", both from Naturally Together, continued the group's hit-making streak. "Don't Stop Now", an uptempo number produced by Smokey Robinson, also became popular, despite not being released as a single.

Chart appearances subsequently became less frequent, with only two appearances on any US charts between 1971 and 1975. In this time the group went through changes in personnel and style, with C.P. Spencer leaving in 1972 and being replaced by former Voice Master Ty Hunter. 1974's Game Called Love saw the Originals experimenting with a more country sound (surprisingly the title track was written and produced by Stevie Wonder) and 1975's California Sunset was an album of modern soul written and produced entirely by Lamont Dozier. Communique from 1976 marked the group's first foray into disco, expanded on with 1977's Down to Love Town. In total the group released some eight albums during their tenure at Motown.

Although the group went on to have more modest success in both the soul and disco fields near the end of the decade, including "Down to Love Town", a No. 1 dance chart hit, the songs they made with Marvin Gaye are arguably their most memorable and notable. Spencer returned briefly in the late 1970s, but after the death of Ty Hunter, on February 24, 1981, the group ceased recording and broke up about a year later. The group had left Motown in 1977, releasing two albums for Columbia and their final album for the independent label Phase II. They later reunited and recorded for Ian Levine's Motorcity Records; the group recorded several songs together including "Take the Only Way Out" which was scheduled for a single release, and individual members (including former member Joe Stubbs) also made some solo recordings. The group duetted with former Motown labelmates the Supremes for one single, "Back by Popular Demand" in 1991. Freddie Gorman also released a handful of solo singles in the 1980s and later released a solo CD (as Freddi G) entitled It's All About Love (1997).

Joe Stubbs, brother of Four Tops lead Levi Stubbs, died on February 5, 1998. He had been with the group for about six months in 1966, as well a member of the Falcons, the Contours, and 100 Proof (Aged In Soul). C. P. Spencer died on October 20, 2004, and the group's spokesman, Freddie Gorman, followed on June 13, 2006. Walter Gaines died January 17, 2012, after a long illness. Dixon is now the only surviving, and active, founding member of the original group.

Reformation

Following the death of Freddie Gorman in 2006, longtime member Hank Dixon and Hank's daughter Terrie Dixon reformed the Originals as a live touring act, with Freddie's son songwriter and producer Dillon F. Gorman, plus the son of Gene Chandler, Defrantz Forrest, to complete the line-up.

Discography

Studio albums

 Album was later reissued as Baby, I'm for Real

Compilation albums

Singles

As background vocalists
1966: "What Becomes of the Brokenhearted" (Jimmy Ruffin; Soul)
1966: "A Place In The Sun" (Stevie Wonder; Tamla)
1968: "Twenty-Five Miles" (Edwin Starr; Gordy)
1968: "Does Your Mama Know About Me" (Bobby Taylor and the Vancouvers; Gordy)
1968: "Malinda" (Bobby Taylor and the Vancouvers; Gordy)
1968: "For Once in My Life" (Stevie Wonder; Tamla)
1968: "Chained" (Marvin Gaye; Tamla)
1969: "Yester-Me, Yester-You, Yesterday" (Stevie Wonder; Tamla)
1969: "My Whole World Ended (The Moment You Left Me)" (David Ruffin; Motown)
1969: "What Does It Take (To Win Your Love)" (Jr. Walker; Soul)
1970: "War" (Edwin Star; Gordy)
1973: "Just to Keep You Satisfied" (from the album "Let's Get It On"; Marvin Gaye; Tamla)

See also
 List of number-one dance hits (United States)
 List of artists who reached number one on the US Dance chart

References

External links
 The Originals on Discogs
 The Originals on SoulExpress
 The Originals at SoulTracks
 The Originals at Yahoo! Music

1966 establishments in Michigan
African-American musical groups
American dance music groups
American soul musical groups
Motown artists
Musical groups established in 1966
Musical groups from Detroit
Northern soul musicians